The U.S. Synchronized Skating Championships is an annual synchronized skating competition, sanctioned by U.S. Figure Skating, held to determine the national champions of the United States. It was first held in 1984. Teams who qualify at a Sectional Championship competition compete in eight levels:  juvenile, intermediate, novice, junior, senior, collegiate, adult and masters. The top two senior teams then go on to compete at the World Synchronized Skating Championships, while at the Junior level the teams competing at the World Junior Synchronized Skating Championships is predetermined by a Junior World Qualifier competition. The teams competing at the Junior Level at the U.S. Synchronized Skating Championships are competing for international assignment for the next years.

Name changes
When first held in 1984, the competition was called the U.S. Precision Championships.

Subsequently, up to and including 1999, this competition was called the U.S. Precision Team Skating (Synchronized Skating) Championships.

In 2000, the name of the competition was changed to U.S. Synchronized Team Skating Championships.

In 2008, the current name U.S. Synchronized Skating Championships was adopted.

Competitive Levels
The definitions for teams in each of the qualify levels are detailed below. All events are judged under the ISU International Judging System (IJS).

Juvenile: A team of 12-20 skaters. Skaters must be under 13 and have passed the pre-juvenile moves in the field test.

Intermediate: A team of 12-20 skaters. Skaters must be under 18 and have passed the juvenile moves in the field test.

Novice: A team of 12-20 skaters. Skaters must be under 16, with the exception of four skaters who may be 16 or 17, and have passed the intermediate moves in the field test.

Junior: A team of 12-16 skaters. Skaters must be at least 13 years old and under 19. All skaters must have passed the novice moves in the field test.

Senior: A team of 16 skaters. Skaters must be at least 15 years old and have passed the junior moves in the field test.

Collegiate: A team of 12-20 skaters. Skaters must be enrolled in a college or degree program as full-time students and have passed the juvenile moves in the field test.

Adult: A team or 12-20 skaters. All skaters must be 21 years or older, with the exception that up to four skaters may be 18, 19 or 20. All skaters must have passed at least one of the following tests: preliminary moves in the field, adult bronze moves in the field, preliminary figure or preliminary dance.

Masters: A team or 12-20 skaters. All skaters must be 25 years or older, with the majority of the team 30 years or older.

Senior medalists

References

External links
 

Figure skating national championships
Figure skating in the United States
Synchronized skating
nat United States